New Eersterust (Nuwe Eersterus) is a township in northwestern Gauteng province, South Africa, about 39 km northwest of Pretoria. It is bordered to the west by Soshanguve and to the east by Hammanskraal. The township is commonly known as "Resi/ Eersterus".

History
It was incorporated into the Gauteng province in 2004 under the jurisdiction of the Tshwane Metro. The semi-rural township is situated between the borders of Gauteng and Northwest provinces, but it has been and it is still governed by Gauteng through the Tshwane Metro.

Education
The most widely spoken languages are Tswana, Northern Sotho, Tsonga and Ndebele.

Subdivisions
The township is divided in blocks A, B, C, D1, D2, E, F1, F2, F3, F4 and Soutpan and Marikana informal settlement. The Tswaing Crater Museum is also located in New Eersterust.

References

Notable Citizens

Townships in Gauteng
Populated places in the City of Tshwane